Dollfusbreen is a glacier in Wedel Jarlsberg Land at Spitsbergen, Svalbard. The glacier has a length of about 1.5 kilometers, is part of the Recherchebreen glacier complex, and is located between Steinegga and Gaimardtoppen. It is named after Arctic explorer Gustav F. Dollfus.

References

Glaciers of Spitsbergen